Sam Mataora (born 20 October 1990) is a Cook Island professional rugby league footballer. He played for the Canberra Raiders and Newcastle Knights in the National Rugby League.

Background
Born in Rarotonga, Cook Islands, Mataora moved to Brisbane, Australia when he was 11 years old and played his junior football for Souths Sunnybank while attending Cavendish State High School. He was then signed by the Canberra Raiders.

Playing career

Early career
In 2009 and 2010, Mataora played for the Canberra Raiders' NYC team. In 2009, he played for the Cook Islands in the 2009 Pacific Cup.

2010
In Round 8 of the 2010 NRL season, Mataora made his NRL debut for the Raiders against the New Zealand Warriors. He played for the Junior Kiwis that year and was named at second-row in the 2010 NYC Team of the Year.

2011
In 2011, Mataora was selected in the Cook Islands 18-man squad to face New Zealand at the end of the year, although the NZRL called off the match due to players being unavailable.

2012
In June 2012, Mataora re-signed with the Raiders on a 2-year contract.

2013
In 2013, Mataora played for the Cook Islands in the 2013 Rugby League World Cup.

2014
In July 2014, Mataora joined the Newcastle Knights mid-season for the remainder of the year. On 1 November 2014, he re-signed with the Knights on a 3-year contract.

2015
In Round 12 of the 2015 NRL season, Mataora made his Knights debut against the New Zealand Warriors. On 27 September, he played in the Knights' 2015 New South Wales Cup Grand Final victory over the Wyong Roos. On 17 October, he played for the Cook Islands against Tonga in their Asia-Pacific Qualifier match for the 2017 Rugby League World Cup

2016
Mataora experience a breakout year in 2016, playing in 20 matches for the Knights and scoring 2 tries.

2017
Due to injuries and fitness, Mataora only played 1 match for the Knights NRL side in 2017. He retired from the game in July after struggling to cope with depression.

References

External links
Newcastle Knights profile
NRL profile

1990 births
Cook Island rugby league players
Cook Island emigrants to Australia
Cook Islands national rugby league team players
Canberra Raiders players
Newcastle Knights players
Mount Pritchard Mounties players
Souths Logan Magpies players
Junior Kiwis players
Rugby league props
Rugby league second-rows
Living people